This is a list of events that happened in 2014 in Mexico. The article also lists the most important political leaders during the year at both federal and state levels.

Incumbents

Federal government 
 President: Enrique Peña Nieto 

 Interior Secretary (SEGOB): Miguel Ángel Osorio Chong
 Secretary of Foreign Affairs (SRE): José Antonio Meade
 Communications Secretary (SCT): Gerardo Ruiz Esparza
 Education Secretary (SEP): Emilio Chuayffet
 Secretary of Defense (SEDENA): Salvador Cienfuegos Zepeda
 Secretary of Navy (SEMAR): Vidal Francisco Soberón Sanz
 Secretary of Labor and Social Welfare (STPS): Alfonso Navarrete Prida
 Secretary of Welfare (BIENESTAR): Rosario Robles
 Tourism Secretary (SECTUR): Claudia Ruiz Massieu
 Secretary of the Environment (SEMARNAT): Juan José Guerra Abud
 Secretary of Health (SALUD): Mercedes Juan López
Secretary of Finance and Public Credit, (SHCP): Luis Videgaray Caso

Governors 

 Aguascalientes: Carlos Lozano de la Torre, 
 Baja California: Francisco Vega de Lamadrid 
 Baja California Sur: Marcos Covarrubias Villaseñor 
 Campeche: Fernando Ortega Bernés,  
 Chiapas: Manuel Velasco Coello 
 Chihuahua: César Duarte Jáquez 
 Coahuila: Rubén Moreira Valdez 
 Colima: Mario Anguiano Moreno 
 Durango: Jorge Herrera Caldera 
 Guanajuato: Miguel Márquez Márquez 
 Guerrero
Ángel Aguirre Rivero , until October 23
Rogelio Ortega Martínez, Interim governor starting October 27 
 Hidalgo: Francisco Olvera Ruiz  
 Jalisco: Aristóteles Sandoval  
 State of Mexico: Eruviel Ávila Villegas  
 Michoacán
Fausto Vallejo , until June 19
Salvador Jara Guerrero, Substitute starting June 20
 Morelos: Graco Ramírez .
 Nayarit: Roberto Sandoval Castañeda 
 Nuevo León: Rodrigo Medina de la Cruz 
 Oaxaca: Gabino Cué Monteagudo 
 Puebla: Rafael Moreno Valle Rosas 
 Querétaro: José Calzada 
 Quintana Roo: Roberto Borge Angulo 
 San Luis Potosí: Fernando Toranzo Fernández 
 Sinaloa: Mario López Valdez 
 Sonora: Guillermo Padrés Elías 
 Tabasco: Eruviel Ávila Villegas 
 Tamaulipas: Egidio Torre Cantú 
 Tlaxcala: Mariano González Zarur 
 Veracruz: Javier Duarte de Ochoa 
 Yucatán: Rolando Zapata Bello 
 Zacatecas: Miguel Alonso Reyes 
Head of Government of the Federal District: Miguel Ángel Mancera

Events

January

February 
 February 22 – Alpine skier Hubertus von Hohenlohe-Langenburg sets the record for the longest span of competing at the Winter Olympic Games, at 30 years.

March 
 March 2–9 – The 2014 Pan American Ice Hockey Tournament take place in Mexico City.

April 
 April 13 – 36 people are killed after the bus in which they were travelling crashed in Acayucan, Veracruz.
 April 18 – A 7.5-magnitude earthquake hits near Petatlán, Guerrero.

May 
 May 12 – Galindo Mellado Cruz, one of the founding members of the Mexican drug cartel Los Zetas, and four other armed men are killed in a shootout with Mexican security forces after they raided Cruz's hideout in the city of Reynosa.

June

July

August
 27 August–September: CENAPRED reported explosions of Popocateptl, accompanied by steam-and-gas emissions with minor ash and ash plumes that rose 800-3,000 m above the volcano's crater, which drifted west, southwest, and west-southwest. On most nights incandescence was observed, increasing during times with larger emissions.
 29 and 31 August 2014: The Washington Volcanic Ash Advisory Center (VAAC) reported discrete ash emissions from Popocateptl.

September 
 September 2 – Plans for a new Mexico City international airport are announced at the President's State of the Union Address.
 September 14 – Hurricane Odile reaches Category 4 strength as it nears Mexico's Baja California coast.
 September 19 – The biographical film Cantinflas, about the Mexican actor of the same name, is released in Mexico.
 September 26 – 6 students from the Raúl Isidro Burgos Rural Teachers College of Ayotzinapa are killed and 43 more disappear after a protest and a confrontation with Iguala, Guerrero police officers.

October 
 October 4 – A mass grave is found outside Iguala, Guerrero, southern Mexico, during the search of the students from Raúl Isidro Burgos Rural Teachers College of Ayotzinapa.
 October 25 – Nuestra Belleza México 2014 takes place.

November 
 November 4 – Mexican Federal Police arrest a mayor and his wife, the alleged masterminds of the kidnapping of 43 students in Iguala, Guerrero.
 November 7 – Parents of Mexico's missing students say authorities found 6 bags containing unidentified corpses; investigations are underway to determine if they are of the missing students. Three people confess their involvement in the massacre.
 November 11 – A mob angry at the kidnapping and murder of 43 students torches the regional headquarters of Mexico's ruling Institutional Revolutionary Party (PRI) in Chilpancingo, Guerrero, and briefly holds a police commander hostage.
 November 12 – Protesters attack the State Congress building in Guerrero setting alight five vehicles.
 November 17 – Former Beltrán Leyva Cartel leader Alfredo Beltrán Leyva is extradited to the United States from Mexico, facing drug trafficking and money laundering offences.
 November 20 – Thousands of protestors gather in Mexico City for a national rally in memory of the 43 missing students. Demonstrators have also called for a nationwide strike.
 November 26 – Mexico's Party of the Democratic Revolution  founder Cuauhtémoc Cárdenas resigns amid internal political crisis resulting from the disappearance of the 43 students in September.

December
December 2 – The number of Chikungunya cases in Chiapas increases from 14 to 39 in one week. Between 17,000 and 18,000 cases have been reported by the Pan American Health Organization.

Awards

Belisario Domínguez Medal of Honor – Eraclio Zepeda
Order of the Aztec Eagle
José Mujica, President of Uruguay
National Public Administration Prize
Ohtli Award
 Bismarck Lepe
 Hispanic Heritage Foundation
 Denise Moreno Ducheny
 Alma Flor Ada 
 Fernando Valenzuela
 Jonathan Rothschild
National Prize for Arts and Sciences
Linguistics and literature – María de los Dolores Castro Varela and Eraclio Zepeda Ramos
Physics, Mathematics, and Natural Sciences – Carlos Federico Arias Ortiz and Mauricio Hernández Ávila
History, Social Sciences, and Philosophy – Néstor García Canclini and Enrique Semo Calev
Technology and Design – José Mauricio López Romero
Popular Arts and Traditions – Carlomagno Pedro Martínez and Alberto Vargas Castellano
Fine arts – Arnaldo José Coen Ávila

Deaths 

January 23 – Miguel Ángel Guzmán Garduño, journalist (Vértice) in Chilpancingo, Guerrero; killed.
January 26 – José Emilio Pacheco, notable writer.
February 5 – Gregorio Jiménez de la Cruz, journalist (Notisur & Liberal del Sur) in Coatzacoalcos, Veracruz; killed.
February 16 – Omar Reyes Fabiánjournalist (Oaxaca Tiempo) in Miahuatlán de Porfirio Díaz, Oaxaca; killed.
February 28 – Benjamín Galván Gómez, journalist (Última Hora & Primera Hora) in Nuevo Laredo, Tamaulipas; killed.
June 2 – Jorge Torres Palacios, journalist (El Dictamen de Guerrero) in Acapulco, Guerrero; killed.
July 14 – Antonio Riva Palacio, politician , Governor of Morelos (1988-1994), Ambassador to Ecuador (b. 1926)
July 30 – Nolberto Herrera Rodríguez, journalist (Canal 9) in Guadalupe, Zacatecas; killed.
August 12 – Murder of Octavio Rojas Hernández: Journalist  (El Buen Tono) in Cosolapa Oaxaca; killed.
August 21 – Marlén Valdez García, journalist (La Última Palabra) in Juárez, Nuevo León; killed.
August 27 – Adrián Gaona Belmonte, journalist (La Comadrita 97.3 FM Radio) in Reynosa, Tamaulipas; killed.
September 3 – Víctor Pérez Pérez, journalist (Sucesos) in Ciudad Juárez, Chihuahua; killed.
October 12 – Octavio Atilano Román Tirado, journalist (ABC Radio) in Mazatlán, Sinaloa; killed.
September 23 (approx.) – Gabriel Gómez Michel, politician , Deputy of the LXII Legislature of the Mexican Congress from Zacatecas.
October 16 – María del Rosario Fuentes Rubio, journalist (Valor por Tamaulipas) in	Reynosa, Tamaulipas; killed.
October 22 – Jesús Antonio Gamboa Urías, journalist (Nueva Prensa) in Los Mochis, Sinaloa; killed.
November 28 – Chespirito "Roberto Gómez Bolaños", actor and writer.
December 15 — Fausto Zapata, lawyer, politician , diplomat, Governor of San Luis Potosí in 1991

See also 

 List of Mexican films of 2014

References

Footnotes

Citations

External links 

 
Mexico
Years of the 21st century in Mexico
Mexico
2010s in Mexico